The 2004 Southend-on-Sea Council election took place on 10 June 2004 to elect members of Southend-on-Sea Unitary Council in Essex, England. One third of the council was up for election and the Conservative party stayed in overall control of the council.

After the election, the composition of the council was
Conservative 33
Labour 9
Liberal Democrat 7
Independent 2

Election result
The results saw the Conservatives make one gain in the election to hold control of the council with 33 seats. The Conservative gain came in St Lukes ward where they defeated the Labour councillor, Reg Copley, who had been first elected to the council in 1963. They also came within 4 votes of gaining Kursaal, but the only other change was an independent gain from the Liberal Democrats in Westborough.

Ward results

References

2004
2004 English local elections
2000s in Essex